Many a Slip may refer to:

 Many a Slip (radio series), a BBC Radio 4 panel game
 Many a Slip (film), a 1931 American comedy film

See also
There's many a slip 'twixt the cup and the lip, an English proverb